"The Actor" is a ballad by Danish soft rock band Michael Learns to Rock. The song is taken from their self-titled debut album, which was released in 1991. It reached number one in Norway and topped Indonesia's airplay charts. The band has played the song regularly during their Asian tours.

Chart performance
"The Actor" had success on several European charts. The song peaked at number one on the Norwegian Singles Chart and entered the top 10 on the Danish and Swedish charts, peaking at numbers four and seven respectively. The song also reached the top 40 on the Swiss Singles Chart, peaking at number 32, and peaked at number 54 on the Eurochart Hot 100.

Track listings
MLTR – Greatest Hits

Charts

References

1991 songs
1991 singles
1990s ballads
Michael Learns to Rock songs
Number-one singles in Norway
Songs written by Jascha Richter